Sümeyye Boyacı (born February 5, 2003) is a Turkish Paralympic swimmer. She competes in the disability category of S5 in freestyle, backstroke and butterfly, specializing in sprint events.

Personal history
Sümeyye Boyacı was born as her parents' first child in Eskişehir, Turkey on February 5, 2003. She has no arms (bilateral congenital upper extremity agenesis) and a hip dislocation as a birth defect.

She was schooled in a special primary school in her hometown, where she learned writing with her foot in the first grade.

Painting career
At the age of four and half, she began painting with her foot. She made a painting for Altın Balık ("The Golden Fish"),   the Turkish translation of the Russian book of tale by Alexander Pushkin. Her painting was presented to the Turkish President Abdullah Gül for his official visit to Russia. In April 2009, her watercolor paintings were on display in a personal exhibition in Moscow, Russia. Boyacı gifted one of her paintings to the First Lady of Russia Svetlana Medvedeva in 2010. In 2014, she participated at an exhibition in Eskişehir for traditional Turkish handicrafts with her paper marblings.

Swimming career
Boyacı decided to begin with swimming as she carefully watched the fish in her aquarium, and discovered that they swim without arms. Boyacı began with swimming in 2008. She has been coached by Mehmet Bayrak since 2012.

In June 2016, she competed at the 30th International German Championships in Berlin. She internationally debuted in the senior class in 2016. She was qualified for the 2016 Summer Paralympics, and represented her country in Rio de Janeiro, Brazil. She failed to capture any medal. She took part at the 2017 European Para Youth Games held in Liguria, Italy, and won the bronze medal in the 50 m Backstroke S1-5 event.

In 2019, she captured the gold medal in the 50 m Backstroke S5 event at the World Para Swimming World Series held in Indianapolis, USA with a time of 45.28. At the 2019 World Para Swimming Championships in London, U.K., she won the silver medal in the 50 m backstroke S5 event with a time of 44.74.

Boyacı's disability swimming classification is S5 due to her limb deficiency as a birth defect.

Achievements

References

Living people
2003 births
People from Eskişehir
Turkish watercolourists
Sportswomen with disabilities
Paralympic swimmers of Turkey
S5-classified Paralympic swimmers
Swimmers at the 2016 Summer Paralympics
Turkish female butterfly swimmers
Turkish female backstroke swimmers
Turkish female freestyle swimmers
Medalists at the World Para Swimming Championships
Medalists at the World Para Swimming European Championships
People without hands
Swimmers at the 2020 Summer Paralympics
21st-century Turkish women